Judge O'Dwyer may refer to:

William O'Dwyer (1890–1964), Kings County (Brooklyn) Court, New York judge before becoming Mayor of New York City
Edward F. O'Dwyer (1860–1922), Chief Justice of the New York City court